The 2017 TCR International Series Zhejiang round was the ninth round of the 2017 TCR International Series season. It took place on 8 October at the Zhejiang International Circuit.

Gabriele Tarquini won the first race starting from fourteenth position, driving a Hyundai i30 N TCR and Robert Huff gained the second one, starting from tenth position, driving a Volkswagen Golf GTI TCR.

Ballast
Due to the results obtained in the previous round, Attila Tassi and Norbert Michelisz both received +30 kg, while both Giacomo Altoè and Dušan Borković received +10 kg. However, since neither Norbert Michelisz or Giacomo Altoè took part, they didn't take ballast at this event.

The Balance of Performance was also adjusted for this event, meaning the Opel Astra TCRs was given a +30 kg of additional weight. While the new Hyundai i30 N TCRs was allowed to run at its minimum weight of 1285 kg. However, following Race 1. The Hyundai's was given a +40 kg of additional weight, as well as having their engine power reduced from a 100% to 95%.

Classification

Qualifying

Notes
 — Alain Menu and Gabriele Tarquini, who had qualified first and second in Q1. Was not allowed to take part in Q2, because their Hyundai i30 N TCRs are running on a temporary homologation, which means that they are not eligible for points.
 — Tengyi Jiang had his times from Q1 deleted, after the team broke the parc fermé rules.

Race 1

Notes
 — Zhendong Zhang was given a 10 second time penalty, for causing a collision with Maťo Homola.

Race 2

Notes
 — Denis Dupont was sent to the back of the grid for Race 2, after his car was taken out of parc fermé, after Race 1.

Standings after the event

Drivers' Championship standings

Model of the Year standings

Teams' Championship standings

 Note: Only the top five positions are included for both sets of drivers' standings.

References

External links
TCR International Series official website

Zhejiang
TCR International Series
TCR